The Maritime Institute of Ireland (MII) was founded in 1941, at a time when World War II was raging and many seamen were in great peril of either being severely injured or losing their lives. Ireland, being an island nation, was dependent on the sea for all forms of movement external to the island as well as for many goods, particularly fuels that were required to keep the economy going. There was therefore a resurgence of interest in all things to do with the sea.

Role
1941, as can be seen, was a critical time in Irish history. Some of the Institute founders, including the longest serving president, Colonel Anthony Lawlor with other supporters. He had been impressing on the government and public, over more than a five-year period, that another European war was inevitable and Ireland with a dependence on maritime links would quickly fall into crisis.

The Institute ran a series of activities supporting their objectives given above with public lectures on maritime themes, public film shows on similarly related subjects and managing their positive inputs to the public press and popular media of the day as well as the specialised maritime press.

A programme of Maritime Weeks, with poster displays, lectures, film-nights, public library displays of maritime material were organised and deputations to the government were arranged. From these initial activities and the ongoing interest generated, the National Maritime Museum of Ireland, operating both a library and museum, was formed.

Achievements
1943-45 First and Second Maritime Weeks held in Dublin

1945  Irish Maritime Survey launched, later taken over by Irish Shipping and organised as Follow the Fleet in 1967.

1949  Schools "Ship Adoption Scheme" launched

1952   Annual Seafarers Memorial Services inaugurated in Dublin

1955   Winter Film Show and later public lectures commenced in Dublin

1956   Institutes Research Department opened under John de Courcy Ireland. Today networked with 40 other countries

1958   Submission to Government and public meeting on need for maritime Search and Rescue helicopters.  Air Corps helicopters were introduced, 1963 after sinking of M/V Halronel

1959   First Maritime Museum opened at St.Michael's Wharf, Dun Laoghaire

1967   Mariner's Church was acquired from the Church of Ireland to use as the National Maritime Museum support for Institute Plan to build Seamen's Memorial for those lost in Irish ships during the 1939-45 War.

1969   Report to Government on coastal shipping resulted in establishment of Short Sea Shipping Association, now the Irish Chamber of Shipping.

1974   Mariner's Church was acquired from the Church of Ireland to use as the National Maritime Museum

1976   Report to Government on need for new patrol vessels for Irish Naval Service.

1977   Joint group established with Marine Officers, Seafarers and Docker's Unions to erect a National Seamen's Memorial

1978   National Maritime Museum of Ireland opened by Dr. Patrick Hillery, President of Ireland.  Cork branch established

1979  European Museum of the Year Awarded to the National Maritime Museum.

1980  First Edition of Register -Ships of Ireland published.

1984  First State Historic Wreck Preservation on the Queen Victoria, sunk off Howth.

Second Edition of Register - Ships of Ireland published.

1989  Death of Institute founder, Col. Tony Lawlor.

1990  Dr. Patrick Hillery, President of Ireland, unveils the Irish National Seamen's Memorial at City Quay, Dublin.

1991  First Institute Council members in the UK and USA.
Dundalk Branch established.

1994  President Mary Robinson opens the 50th Anniversary Exhibition of the Kerlogue Rescue.  168 German seamen were rescued in the Bay of Biscay. Survivors attended.

1995  Dun Laoghaire Rathdown County Council agrees adoption of Irish Navy Flagship LE Eithne on Institute initiative.

1996  Gulbenkian Award for Best Volunteer Museum was presented by President Mary Robinson to the National Maritime Museum of Ireland.

2012 Museum reopened

2014 Library and Archive reopened

Donations
In 1950 the institute was given a notable collection consisting of ship models, (some unique), charts, uniforms, maritime pictures and books all of which were donated under the terms of the will of the two daughters of one of the 19th century's great Irish seamen, Captain Robert Halpin of Wicklow.  Captain Halpin had made history by laying the first successful oceanic cables in the North and South Atlantic and Indian Oceans as well as the Mediterranean Sea. The ship used for this work was Brunel designed Great Eastern, which for nearly half a century was the world's largest steamship.  A model of this, made under Halpin's supervision, is one of the famous items in the Institute's "Halpin collection".

Foundation of an Irish Maritime Fleet
The Irish Marine Service played an important role in setting up the first Irish fisheries protection fleet. Seamus Ó Muiris, a former officer in the Royal Navy, had made persistent representations to successive Irish governments, favouring the creation of a fleet and was appointed as its Commander, when approved. In this, he had been strongly supported by Colonel Anthony Lawlor, the wartime Commander of the Marine Coast Watching Service. The first vessel purchased by the government was the HMY Helga, which was renamed Muirchú after independence.

External links
 

Maritime history of Ireland
1941 establishments in Ireland